SBX may refer to:

 Sea-based X-band Radar, a type of a floating, self-propelled, mobile radar station
 Snowboard cross, a snowboard competition
 sbX, a bus rapid transit service in San Bernardino County, California, U.S.
 South Bay Expressway, a toll road in San Diego County, California, U.S.
 SBX, the airport code for Shelby Airport near Shelby, Montana, U.S.
 .sbx, a file format that stores an optional spatial index of the features of a shapefile
 Student book exchange, a book swapping or textbook exchange service provided by various colleges and universities for their students